Sdei Hemed (lit. Pleasant Fields) is a moshav in central Israel. Located near Kfar Saba and covering 2,000 dunams, it falls under the jurisdiction of Drom HaSharon Regional Council.

History
The moshav was founded in 1952 as part of the 'From the city to the village' project. Its name is taken from Isaiah 32:12:
Smiting upon the breasts for the pleasant fields, for the fruitful vine

References

Moshavim
Populated places established in 1952
Populated places in Central District (Israel)
1952 establishments in Israel